Diospyros alatella is a tree in the family Ebenaceae. The specific epithet  is from the Latin meaning "with small wing", referring to the fruit. Habitat is forests from sea level to  altitude. D. alatella is endemic to Borneo and confined to Sarawak.

References

alatella
Endemic flora of Borneo
Trees of Borneo
Flora of Sarawak
Plants described in 1977